React is the first EP by Japanese band Wagakki Band and their first studio release under Universal Music Japan sublabel Universal Sigma. It was released on June 12, 2019 in three editions: CD only, CD with photo book, and CD with DVD. In addition, a Universal Music Store exclusive box set with all versions was released. The band conceptualized the EP as a way to express their belief with a strong will to deliver their music to people all over the world.

The EP peaked at No. 5 on Oricon's albums chart.

Track listing
All tracks are arranged by Wagakki Band.

Personnel 
 Yuko Suzuhana – vocals
 Machiya – guitar
 Beni Ninagawa – tsugaru shamisen
 Kiyoshi Ibukuro – koto
 Asa – bass
 Daisuke Kaminaga – shakuhachi
 Wasabi – drums
 Kurona – wadaiko

Charts

References

External links 
 
  (Universal Music Japan)
 

Wagakki Band albums
2019 EPs
Japanese-language albums
Universal Sigma EPs